Quinoa is the forty-sixth release by the German band Tangerine Dream.

Background
Quinoa was released as a limited edition of 1000 copies. It was sent out as a special gift to members of the now defunct official TD International Fan Club, and the remaining copies were sold during their German tour in 1997. The CD featured one single composition "Quinoa" of 28 minutes.

The album was re-issued in 1998 on their new label TDI. It was sold in unlimited quantity, and contained two bonus tracks. One of these tracks, "Voxel Ux", was originally composed for a competition on the band's official 1996 homepage. The winner received a CDR with the track, of which there is only one copy. "Lhasa" was described as the first movement in TD's "Tibetan Cycle", with 6 other tracks within the cycle that remained unreleased until 2000, when they were released as the album The Seven Letters From Tibet. "Lhasa" was extended and became the track "The Blue Pearl".

In March 2009, Quinoa was re-issued again on Membran Music Ltd with new cover art as part of the band's extensive digipack series.

Track listing

Personnel
 Edgar Froese
 Jerome Froese

References

1992 albums
Tangerine Dream albums